The Hong Kong Aviation Club is an aviation club which offers training on both fixed-wing aircraft and helicopter to Private Pilot Licence Level. It was established in 1982 upon the amalgamation of the Hong Kong Flying Club, the Aero Club of Hong Kong and the Far East Flying Training School.

History
The Hong Kong Flying Club was formed in the late 1920s when the governor, Sir Cecil Clementi, presided over the inaugural meeting on 20 December 1929. Flight training commenced at Kai Tak in the second half of 1930 and followed by commercial services six years later with the arrival of Dorado from Malaysia on 24 March 1936.

It formerly held most of its activities at Kai Tak Airport, where it had hangars and other facilities. The club moved most of its aircraft to Shek Kong Airfield in 1994 after the hours for general aviation at Kai Tak were sharply reduced, to two hours per morning, as of July 1 that year. Kai Tak closed to fixed-wing traffic in 1998. The club ended its helicopter activities at Kai Tak on 9 July 2017. The Kai Tak location, which it was able to use all days of the week, meant that helicopter training took less time compared to fixed-wing training, as usage at Shek Kong is restricted to weekends.

The club today
Today, the Aviation Club remains as the only Kai Tak heritage and history of the former Kai Tak Airport. Part of the Administration building, located at 31 Sung Wong Toi Road is used for the headquarters of the Hong Kong Air Cadet Corps through the courtesy of the Aviation Club.  Hong Kong Aviation Club is also the home to the 1661st Scout Group and the Hong Kong Aviation Club Foundation, a charity organisation which promote General Aviation in Hong Kong to the youth. The Hong Kong Aviation Club remains the only organisation in Hong Kong which offers training on both fixed-wing aircraft and helicopter to Private Pilot Licence Level, including all required ground course subjects. The club is also the only organisation in Hong Kong where such a licence can be kept current.

The club's fleet of seven Cessna planes and five Robinson helicopters is available for both training and leisure flying. All flying activities take place at Shek Kong Airfield. Full-time qualified engineers are employed to maintain aircraft of the club as well as members' aircraft. Hangar facilities are both located at Shek Kong Airfield and Kai Tak Airport. General aviation aircraft are not permitted at Hong Kong International Airport at Chek Lap Kok without prior approval from the Civil Aviation Department and the Hong Kong Airport Authority. Since 2003, the Aviation Club has organised a number of cross country flight into Macau and Southern China with departure from Chek Lap Kok.

The club is a member of the Fédération Aéronautique Internationale (FAI), and is the local authority representing the FAI to issue Sporting Licences for Hong Kong participants as well as the National Sports Association (NSA) for Hong Kong in Aviation.

Membership 
The club offers two major levels of membership: Full Membership (Flying) and Non-flying Membership. Full membership provides individuals with access to flight training and leisure flying. General membership provides Non-Flying members with the opportunity to access to General Aviation activities and dining facilities of the club. Membership is open to all Hong Kong residents.

Fleet
 Cessna 172P 
 Cessna 152 Aerobat 
 Cessna 152
 Beagle Aircraft Beagle Pup  (retired)
 Cessna 172N 
  Cessna 172R 
 Cessna 182 
 Robinson Helicopter R22 and R44

See also
 Hong Kong Air Cadet Corps

Footnotes

References

External links

 

Aviation in Hong Kong
Clubs and societies in Hong Kong
Flying clubs
Grade III historic buildings in Hong Kong
Kowloon City District
Ma Tau Chung
Kowloon City
1929 establishments in Hong Kong